Clube Recreativo Atlético Campoverdense, commonly known as CRAC, is a Brazilian football club based in Campo Verde, Mato Grosso state.

History
The club was founded on October 19, 2005.

Stadium
Clube Recreativo Atlético Campoverdense play their home games at Estádio Municipal Félix Belém de Castro. The stadium has a maximum capacity of 3,000 people.

References

Association football clubs established in 2005
Football clubs in Mato Grosso
2005 establishments in Brazil